Rodolphe Monty  (November 30, 1874 – December 1, 1928) was a Canadian politician.

Early life 

Born in Montreal, Quebec, Monty was educated in law at Université Laval and McGill University. He was called to the Bar of Quebec in 1897 and was created a King's Counsel in 1909.

Political career 

In September 1921, Monty was appointed Secretary of State of Canada in the cabinet of Arthur Meighen. A Conservative, he was defeated in the 1921 federal election in the riding of Beauharnois. He was also defeated in the riding of Laurier—Outremont in the 1925 election.

Electoral History

References
 

1874 births
1928 deaths
Conservative Party of Canada (1867–1942) candidates for the Canadian House of Commons
Members of the King's Privy Council for Canada
Canadian King's Counsel
McGill University alumni